Ekwulumili is a town in the Nnewi South Local Government Area of Anambra State, Nigeria. It shares boundaries in the north with the town of Igbo-Ukwu, in the south with the towns of Osumenyi and Akwa-Ihedi, in the east with the towns of Unubi and Ezinifite, and in the west with the town of Amichi.

Among schools, festivals and other cultural institutions, Ekwulumili is the future home to a National Craft Centre.

Climate

References

External links
Town of Ekwulumili

Nnewi
Populated places in Anambra State